The Lucidity Institute is an incorporated research institute founded in 1987 by Stephen LaBerge that supports lucid dreaming research and development of techniques that help people achieve lucid dreams (conscious dreams). For some time, it also produced induction devices. It currently holds seminars about lucid dreaming under the title "Dreaming and Awakening" in Kalani, Hawaii.

References

External links
 The Lucidity Institute, Inc.

Lucid dreams